Luke Timothy Johnson (born November 20, 1943) is an American New Testament scholar and historian of early Christianity. He is the Robert W. Woodruff Professor of New Testament and Christian Origins at Candler School of Theology and a Senior Fellow at the Center for the Study of Law and Religion at Emory University.

Johnson's research interests encompass the Jewish and Greco-Roman contexts of early Christianity (particularly moral discourse), Luke-Acts, the Pastoral Epistles, and the Epistle of James.

Early life 
A native of Park Falls, Wisconsin, Johnson was educated in public and parochial schools. A Benedictine monk and priest at St. Joseph Abbey, St. Benedict, Louisiana from 1963 to 1972, he received a B.A. in Philosophy from Notre Dame Seminary in 1966, a M.Div. in Theology from Saint Meinrad School of Theology in 1970, an M.A. in Religious Studies from Indiana University, and a Ph.D. in New Testament from Yale University in 1976. He has taught at St. Meinrad, Saint Joseph Seminary College, Yale Divinity School, and Indiana University.

Academic career
Johnson is a critic of the Jesus Seminar, having taken stances against Burton Mack, Robert Funk and John Dominic Crossan in discussions of the "historical Jesus".  Johnson objects to the Seminar's historical methodology.  He is also a proponent of an early dating for the Epistle of James, arguing:

The Letter of James also, according to the majority of scholars who have carefully worked through its text in the past two centuries, is among the earliest of New Testament compositions.  It contains no reference to the events in Jesus' life, but it bears striking testimony to Jesus' words.  Jesus' sayings are embedded in James' exhortations in a form that is clearly not dependent on the written Gospels.

In some areas, Johnson disagrees with Roman Catholic teaching. He has argued that "same-sex unions can be holy and good" and is in favor of "full recognition of gay and lesbian persons within the Christian communion."

Johnson has produced lectures on early Christianity and ancient Greek philosophy for The Teaching Company.

Recognition
He is the recipient of the 2011 University of Louisville Grawemeyer Award in Religion.

Personal life
Johnson married Joy Randazzo in 1974 and is stepfather to six children and father of one.

Publications

 (Commentary)

 (Commentary) 
 (Commentary) 

 (Commentary) 

 (Commentary) 
 (Commentary) 

 (Commentary) 

 (Commentary) 

Johnson is also the author of a large number of scholarly articles, encyclopedia, anthology and popular articles, book reviews, and other academic papers and lectures.

References

External links
Center for the Interdisciplinary Study of Religion Senior Fellow
Emory University Faculty Home Page

1943 births
Living people
American Benedictines
Yale University alumni
American biblical scholars
Roman Catholic biblical scholars
Christian scholars
New Testament scholars
Laicized Roman Catholic priests
People from Park Falls, Wisconsin
Writers from Wisconsin
Seminary academics
Indiana University alumni
Indiana University faculty
Yale Divinity School faculty
Catholics from Wisconsin
Former Benedictines